The 2013–14 season is the 112th season of competitive football in Hong Kong, starting in July 2013 and ending in June 2014.

Promotion and relegation

Clubs removed
 Blake Garden were placed bottom of the table last season, meaning being eliminated from Hong Kong league system.

Representative team

Hong Kong

2015 AFC Asian Cup qualification

The draw for the group stage of qualification was held in Australia on 9 October 2012. Hong Kong was drawn with Uzbekistan, United Arab Emirates and Vietnam. Hong Kong will start their 2015 Asian Cup qualifying campaign in February 2013.

Match detail

Match detail

Match detail

Match detail

2014 Guangdong–Hong Kong Cup

This is a tournament between two teams representing Hong Kong and Guangdong Province of China respectively. The first leg will take place in Hong Kong, being held at Mong Kok Stadium, and the second leg took place in Huizhou, Guangdong, being held at Huizhou Olympic Stadium.

Match detail

|}

Friendly matches in first half season
Head coach Kim Pan-Gon confirmed that two friendly matches are arranged in September for the preparation of 2015 AFC Asian Cup qualification. Hong Kong will face Myanmar away on 6 September, and return to Hong Kong for another friendly match against Singapore on 10 September.

Match detail

Match detail

First Division League

Second Division League

Third Division League

Fourth Division League

Transfers

Managerial changes
 The following table only shows changes in First Division.

Exhibition matches

Manchester United's Tour 2013 against Kitchee
2012–13 Premier League champions Manchester United will play against 2012–13 Hong Kong FA Cup champions Kitchee on Monday, 29 July 2013 at the Hong Kong Stadium as part of Manchester United's Tour 2013.

Match detail

Premier League Asia Trophy

Match detail

References